Orkan Telhan (born 1976 in Oberhausen, West Germany) is an interdisciplinary artist, designer and researcher. Telhan is Associate Professor of Fine Arts, Emerging Design Practices in the School of Design at The University of Pennsylvania.

Telhan holds a PhD in Design and Computation from MIT's Department of Architecture. He was part of the Sociable Media Group at the MIT Media Laboratory and a researcher at the MIT Design Laboratory. He studied Media Arts at the State University of New York at Buffalo and theories of media and representation, visual studies and Graphic Design at Bilkent University.

His individual and collaborative work has been exhibited internationally in venues including the Istanbul Biennial (2013), Istanbul Design Biennial (2012, 2016), Milano Design Week, Vienna Design Week, the Armory Show 2015 Special Projects, Ars Electronica, ISEA, LABoral, ArchiLab, Architectural Association, The Architectural League of New York, MIT Museum, Museum of Contemporary Art Detroit, and the New Museum of Contemporary Art, New York.

In 2016, Telhan's design monograph "Designature: The Nature of Signatures in Art and Design" was published from Revolver Publishing, Berlin.

Telhan is also co-founder and Chief Design and Technology Officer of Biorealize Inc., a biotech company specialized in making next generation tools to make it easier to design with biology.

References

External links 
 https://web.archive.org/web/20121111001330/http://www.orkantelhan.info/

Interdisciplinary artists
University of Pennsylvania faculty
Living people
1976 births